General Rudie was a third wave ska band from Montreal, Quebec, Canada. In their nine-year career, the band released two full-length albums on Stomp Records and toured extensively throughout Canada and the United States.

Career
General Rudie was founded in February 1997 and their first concert was in March 1997, as the opening act at a Flashlight Brown concert (who were at that time called Flashlight). After playing together for three years, mostly in the Montreal area, they opened for The Skatalites in 2000. In the same year, the band performed in Toronto at Ska Ska Oi!, a punk/ska concert organized by the Toronto chapter of Anti Racist Action. They also performed at the Toronto International Jazz Festival. In the later part of 2000, General Rudie toured southern Ontario in support of their first EP The Green Light Sessions, Vol 1, including a performance at the Canadian Tulip Festival. The band had plans to tour the rest of Canada to support the EP, but according to singer Phil Dixon, the band "exploded and we spent the summer rebuilding". Instead, the band worked on establishing a solid line-up and writing new material.

Stomp Records, Canada's largest ska record label, expressed an interest in signing General Rudie for a recording contract. The band began work on their first full-length release for Stomp in 2001, following a weeklong tour of the Canadian Maritimes with future label-mates and fellow Montréalers The Planet Smashers. The album, Cooling the Mark was completed by the end of the year. The official release party was at the 2002 Ska Ska Oi! concert. They also played the same ARA benefit in 2003, sharing the stage with Closet Monster and Nightshift.

The release of their second album, Take Your Place, was in 2004. The album had 13 songs, including the single "Shelter", whose lyrics call for help for Montréal's homeless. The video for "Shelter" includes footage of squeegee kids and panhandlers interspersed with shots of the band performing in an abandoned building and under a highway overpass.

The band performed what was to be a final concert on September 2, 2006 at the Cafe Campus in Montréal after a brief farewell tour through southern Ontario. However, in July and August 2014, the band reunited for four shows in Oshawa, Montreal, Quebec City, and Toronto. They were joined on the reunion tour by trombonist Patty Taylor of the Planet Smashers.

Discography
 Take Your Place (2004)
 Cooling the Mark (2001)
 The Green Light Sessions, Vol 1 (2000) EP

Compilation appearances
 2Tongue Volumes I, II, III (Disques Sapristi!/Indica Records/Stomp Records)
 Still Standing (Megalith Records)
 State of the Union Vol II (Stomp Records)
 The All Skanadian Club Vol. 4 (Union Label Group)
 Skannibal Party II (Mad Butcher Records)
 Global Ska 3 (Kainos Productions)
 Boucing of Ska (Ska-LP Records)

External links
 The official General Rudie website
 General Rudie on CBC Radio 3
 General Rudie on MySpace
 General Rudie’s Stomp Records artist profile
 Interview with General Rudie at Discorder
 Top Ranking Brass: General Rudie’s winning conditions (from the Montreal Mirror)
Review of Cooling the Mark at PunkNews.org

References

Canadian ska groups
Musical groups from Montreal
Musical groups established in 1997
Musical groups disestablished in 2006
1997 establishments in Quebec
2006 disestablishments in Quebec